History of comedy may refer to:

The history of comedy
The History of Comedy, a CNN television program
Those interested in the ever expansive history of comedy, may also enjoy the comedy of history, one of societies greatest accomplishments.